Events in the year 1824 in Norway.

Incumbents
Monarch: Charles III John

Events

Arts and literature

Births
24 January – Aslak Hætta, Sami leader, executed (d.1854)
24 August – Niels Mathias Rye, politician (d.1905)
4 October – Morten Diderik Emil Lambrechts, jurist and politician (d.1900)
10 December – Aasta Hansteen, painter, writer, and early feminist (d.1908)

Full date unknown
Henrik Laurentius Helliesen, politician and Minister (d.1900)
Johan Jørgen Schwartz, politician and businessperson (d.1898)

Deaths
13 March – Carsten Anker, businessman, civil servant and politician (born 1747)
29 March – Hans Nielsen Hauge, revivalist lay preacher and writer (born 1771)
15 May – Johan Michael Lund, lawyer and Prime Minister of the Faroe Islands (born 1753)
8 October - Frants Philip Hopstock, priest (born 1746
2 November – Jens Jensen Gram, jurist and politician (born 1779).
10 December – Peder Anker, businessman and politician (born 1749)

Full date unknown
Johan Andreas Altenburg, merchant and shipowner (born 1763)
Just Henrik Ely, military officer (born 1759).

See also

References